Girls Dancing Around an Obelisk is an oil-on-canvas painting by French painter Hubert Robert, made in 1798. It is held at the Montreal Museum of Fine Arts since 1964.

History and description
Hubert Robert had a fascination with the Ancient Egypt, typical of the pre-romanticism of his time. This painting depicts, in an imaginary Egyptian architectural setting, where the Giza pyramids can be seen in the distance, a group of nine young female dancers, wearing white dresses in an antique style and blue and red ribbons at the waist, performing a farandole around the base of an Egyptian obelisk, whose truncated top lies on the ground on the right of the composition, in the shadows. A broken Sphinx is seen at the left, behind the obelisk. The scene is completed by a group of people dressed in more modern attire detailing the ruins, in the lower left, and by musicians playing their instruments perched on a ledge of the obelisk. The tiny figures illustrate the huge dimension, at the distance, of the pyramids.

Analysis
Some have interpreted the painting as a symbolic reference to the Masonic lodge of the Nine Sisters, and also to the opposition between the ancient and the modern world, or to the Egyptian campaign taken by Napoleon.

References

1798 paintings
Paintings by Hubert Robert
Paintings in the collection of the Montreal Museum of Fine Arts
Dance in art
Musical instruments in art